Life on the Murder Scene is a live album/compilation album by American rock band My Chemical Romance. It was released on March 21, 2006. The release includes three discs (two DVDs and one CD) of the whole history documenting the band from the start to the present. Life on the Murder Scene is a predominantly live album, but also includes two demo tracks and a previously unreleased track. Models Jamisin Matthews and Jaime Andrews portray the demolition couple in the cover photo, booklet, packaging, DVD art, and DVD menus. The demo of "Bury Me in Black" was previously released as a bonus track on the Japanese release of Three Cheers for Sweet Revenge.

One DVD documents the band on the road in the form of a diary and the other covers live footage, Sessions@AOL, MTV $2 Bill performance, and four of their videos with the behind-the-scenes "Making Of..." for three of them. The cover features a live version of "Demolition Lovers II" (the name of the album cover of Three Cheers for Sweet Revenge).

The album has seen decent success in Australia, peaking at #2 on the ARIA Top 40 DVD Chart, and also in the U.S., peaking at #30 on the Billboard 200 and #1 on the Heetseekers.

Certifications

Life on the Murder Scene has been certified 2× platinum by the RIAA indicating shipment of over 200,000 units as it is considered a long-form video.

Artwork
The artwork features a live-action re-enactment of the Three Cheers for Sweet Revenge album cover.

Track listing

CD
All songs written and composed by My Chemical Romance.

DVD 1

DVD 2

Personnel

My Chemical Romance
 Bob Bryar — drums (live performance and music videos)
 Frank Iero — rhythm guitar, backing vocals
 Matt Pelissier — drums (studio tracks)
 Ray Toro — lead guitar, backing vocals
 Mikey Way — bass
 Gerard Way — lead vocals

DVD credits
DVD post production: David May, Raena Winscott, Traci Samxzyk
DVD mastered by Outpost Sound
DVD menu animation designed by Magnetic Dreams
DVD authoring by Mighty Forces Productions
Directors: Brad Nolan & Greg Kaplan
Executive producers: Craig Aaronson, Brian Schechter & Brad Nolan
Camera & Interview Footage:  Brad Nolan
Management: Brian Schechter/Riot Squad
Documentary Director/Editor: Greg Kaplan
Legal: Stacy Fass
Agent: Matt Galle/Ellis Industries (USA), Geoff Meall/The Agency Group (UK & Europe)
A&R: Craig Aaronson
Art Direction and Photography by P.R. Brown at Bau-Da Design Lab
Design by Trevor Niemann at Bau-Da Design Lab

Charts

Certifications

References

My Chemical Romance live albums
My Chemical Romance video albums
2006 live albums
2006 video albums
Live video albums
Rockumentaries